Alexander Abdelmajeed (Alex) Khateeb (born 8 June 1984) is a British racing driver, currently driving in Eurocup Formula Renault 2.0.

Career 
At the age of nine, Khateeb started karting at Bristol Karting Centre. At the age of 15 he raced for the first time in a Formula Ford at Castle Combe.

In the 2006–07 season, Khateeb joined the Lebanon team in the A1 Grand Prix series to complete rookies practice sessions. He raced in two events, replacing Khalil Beschir. He races with the Lebanon team because of his Lebanese descent with his family originating in Tyre, Lebanon.

Khateeb is now involved in professional Drifting.

Career results

References

External links 
 Biography at CircuitArt
 Driver Statistics at results.a1gp.com
 

1984 births
English racing drivers
Living people
A1 Team Lebanon drivers
Formula Renault Eurocup drivers
British Formula Three Championship drivers
Sportspeople from Bath, Somerset
British people of Lebanese descent
Carlin racing drivers
A1 Grand Prix drivers
OAK Racing drivers